Rocca Busambra is the highest peak in the Monti Sicani, in western Sicily, southern Italy.

Geography
The mount has  the appearance of a flat, isolated ridge, with the Bosco della Ficuzza wood occupying its slopes. It is  located between the territories of Godrano and Monreale, and above the village of Ficuzza, an enclave of Corleone. The territory is part of the Metropolitan City of Palermo.

References

 Placido Rizzotto was an Italian socialist partisan and trade union leader from Corleone who was kidnapped and murdered by Sicilian Mafia on 10 March 1948. His remains were found on 7 July 2009, on a cliff in Rocca Busambra.

External links 

 Page at summipost.org

Busambra
Monreale
Corleone